Acraga infusa, the yellow furry-legs, is a moth of the family Dalceridae. It is found in Guatemala, Belize, Costa Rica, Panama, Colombia, Venezuela, Trinidad, Guyana, Suriname, French Guiana, Ecuador, Brazil, Peru, Bolivia and Paraguay.

Acraga infusa may represent one variable species, but could also represent a species complex of closely related species. All specimens are entirely orange, but varying considerably in size and somewhat in apparent wing shape and colour tone.

References

Dalceridae
Moths described in 1905